Perapion is a genus of pear-shaped weevils in the family of beetles known as Brentidae. There are about 12 described species in Perapion.

Species
These 12 species belong to the genus Perapion:

 Perapion antiquum (Gyllenhal, 1833) i g
 Perapion connexum (Schilsky, 1902) g
 Perapion curtirostre (Germar, 1817) g b
 Perapion ilvense (Wagner, 1905) g
 Perapion jacobsoni (Wagner, 1910) g
 Perapion lemoroi (C.Brisout de Barneville, 1880) g
 Perapion neofallax (Warner, 1958) i g
 Perapion pulchrum b
 Perapion punctinasum (J.B.Smith, 1884) g b
 Perapion subviolaceum (Desbrochers, 1908) g
 Perapion violaceum (Kirby, 1808) i
 Perapion wickhami (Kissinger, 1960) g

Data sources: i = ITIS, c = Catalogue of Life, g = GBIF, b = Bugguide.net

References

Further reading

External links

 

Brentidae